GENERATION:  25 Years of Contemporary Art in Scotland was a nationwide exhibition programme held in Scotland in 2014 showcasing the work of contemporary Scottish artists.

The programme traced the developments in art in Scotland since 1989. It featured over 100 artists in more than 60 venues. The art that emerged from Scotland during this period is characterised by its diversity, rather than by one particular style or dominant trend.

GENERATION was delivered as a partnership between the National Galleries of Scotland, Glasgow Life and Creative Scotland and is part of Culture 2014, the Glasgow 2014 Cultural Programme.

Artists involved
 Charles Avery
Beagles & Ramsay
 Karla Black
 Christine Borland
 Martin Boyce
 Roderick Buchanan
 Duncan Campbell
 Steven Campbell
 Paul Carter
 Nathan Coley
 Alan Currall
 Dalziel + Scullion
 Moyna Flannigan
 Alec Finlay
 Luke Fowler
 Michael Fullerton
 Douglas Gordon
 Ellie Harrison
 Louise Hopkins
 Kenny Hunter
 Callum Innes
 Jim Lambie
 Lucy McKenzie
 Wendy McMurdo
 Alan Michael
 Jonathan Monk
 Rosalind Nashashibi
 Katie Paterson
 Ciara Phillips
 David Sherry
 David Shrigley
 Lucy Skaer
 Simon Starling
 Sue Tompkins
 Hanna Tuulikki
 Alison Watt
 Cathy Wilkes
 Richard Wright

Participating galleries and arts organisations
 Aberdeen Art Gallery
 An Lanntair
 ATLAS Arts
 Centre for Contemporary Arts
 Dundee Contemporary Arts
 Dick Institute
 Dovecot Studios
 Duff House
 Edinburgh Art Festival
 Glasgow Print Studio
 Glasgow Women's Library
 Gallery of Modern Art
 Gracefield Arts Centre
 House for an Art Lover
 Inverleith House
 Inverness Museum and Art Gallery
 Kelvingrove Art Gallery and Museum
 Mount Stuart House
 National Galleries of Scotland
 People's Palace
 Paxton House
 Perth Museum and Art Gallery
 Pier Arts Centre
 Riverside Museum
 Royal Scottish Academy
 Talbot Rice Gallery
 The Fruitmarket Gallery
 Tramway

References

Scottish contemporary art
Arts festivals in Scotland
2014 in Scotland
2014 in art